Sherlock Holmes was a detective television series syndicated in the autumn of 1954, based on the Sherlock Holmes stories of Arthur Conan Doyle. The 39 half-hour mostly original stories were produced by Sheldon Reynolds and filmed in France by Guild Films, starring Ronald Howard (son of Leslie Howard) as Holmes and H. Marion Crawford as Watson. Archie Duncan appeared in many episodes as Inspector Lestrade (and in a few as other characters). Richard Larke, billed as Kenneth Richards, played Sgt. Wilkins in about fifteen episodes. The series' associate producer, Nicole Milinaire, was one of the first women to attain a senior production role in a television series.

The series was the first American television adaptation of Doyle's stories, and the only such version until 2012's Elementary.

Production
Sheldon Reynolds had been successful with his 1951 European-made series Foreign Intrigue (in 1956, he directed a film with the same title starring Robert Mitchum) and decided a Sherlock Holmes series made in France for the American syndication market might also be successful. Reynolds contacted the Doyle family and began his research into producing a Holmesian television series. Although only 39 episodes were made, a second season of 39 episodes was scheduled to begin production in June 1955. Many of the episodes were directed by Steve Previn, the brother of composer André Previn.

Reynolds also produced a second Sherlock Holmes TV series, entitled Sherlock Holmes and Doctor Watson (1979–1980). Many of the 1954 TV episodes were remade in the second series.

Casting
Reynolds desired to present the Holmes of A Study in Scarlet.

Ronald Howard, then 36, was chosen to portray Sherlock Holmes. Howard shared Reynolds's view of Holmes and his portrayal was much more laid back than the more famous version portrayed by Basil Rathbone.

Howard Marion Crawford, credited as H. Marion Crawford, was cast as Watson and it was a role Crawford had long wanted to play. Crawford desired to play Watson as something other than the buffoon as typified by Nigel Bruce's portrayal.

Scottish actor Archie Duncan was cast as Inspector Lestrade. Much akin to Dennis Hoey in the Rathbone/Bruce series of films, Duncan's Lestrade was used as comic relief.

Besides the three principals (Howard, Crawford and Duncan), a number of actors appeared regularly in the series, including Belgian-born Eugene Deckers, who played no fewer than seven different characters, including both victims and villains. Notable actors and actresses who appeared as guests included: Paulette Goddard ("The Case of Lady Beryl"), Delphine Seyrig ("The Mother Hubbard Case", "The Case of the Singing Violin"), Michael Gough ("The Case of the Perfect Husband"), Dawn Addams, Mary Sinclair, and Natalie Schafer ("The Case of the Shy Ballerina"). John Buckmaster played character roles in two episodes ("The Case of the Haunted Gainsborough", "The Case of the Unlucky Gambler"), and  Barry Mackay, whose career was nearing its end, also appeared in one episode ("The Case of the Laughing Mummy").

Filming
Several sets were built in Paris for the street outside 221B Baker Street and the flat itself, both of which were designed by Michael Weight, the same man who built the Festival of Britain 221B exhibit. There were a number of other sets built for a variety of locations and then redressed as necessary (houses, Scotland Yard, shops, parks, offices, etc.)

There was very little location work and most of the series was filmed in the studio with many stock shots of carriages on London Bridge and near Big Ben, giving the impression of London. However, on a few occasions, such as "The Case of the Eiffel Tower", the French filming locations were used. French actors were extensively used in small parts and several affected English accents with varying levels of success. Production was halted each day at exactly 4 o'clock for Duncan to spend fifteen minutes enjoying a special blend of tea he had shipped from London.

Source material
Most of the show's 39 episodes are non-Canonical original adventures, but a few are directly based on Arthur Conan Doyle's stories: "The Case of the French Interpreter" (based on "The Adventure of the Greek Interpreter"), "The Case of the Pennsylvania Gun" (based on The Valley of Fear), "The Case of the Shoeless Engineer" (based on "The Adventure of the Engineer's Thumb"), and "The Case of the Red-Headed League" (based on "The Red-Headed League"). The first episode, "The Case of the Cunningham Heritage," adapts the first section of A Study in Scarlet, in which Holmes and Watson's relationship is established, and develops an original story from there.

Several other episodes are identified by Alan Barnes in his book Sherlock Holmes On Screen: The Complete Film and TV History as being loosely inspired by other Doyle tales: "The Case of Lady Beryl" by "The Adventure of the Second Stain," "The Case of the Exhumed Client" by "The Adventure of the Devil's Foot," "The Case of the Diamond Tooth" by "The Adventure of the Speckled Band," "The Case of the Winthrop Legend" by "The Five Orange Pips," "The Case of the Violent Suitor" by "The Adventure of the Illustrious Client," and "The Case of the Christmas Pudding" by "The Adventure of the Empty House" and "The Adventure of the Mazarin Stone".

Episodes

Home media
In 2005, Mill Creek Entertainment released Sherlock Holmes: The Complete Series, a three-disc DVD set featuring all 39 episodes of the series.  Also in 2005, Elstree Hill Entertainment released all 39 episodes as The Adventures of Sherlock Holmes on ten discs. In 2010, Mill Creek released Sherlock Holmes: Greatest Mysteries, a five-disc DVD set featuring all 39 episodes plus eight unrelated Holmes films:  The Sign of Four (1932), A Study in Scarlet (1933), The Triumph of Sherlock Holmes (1935), Silver Blaze, also known as Murder at the Baskervilles (1937), Sherlock Holmes and the Secret Weapon (1943), The Woman in Green (1945), Terror by Night (1946), and Dressed to Kill (1946). On March 9, 2010, Allegro/Pop Flix released "Classic TV Sherlock Holmes Collection", a four-disc DVD set featuring all 39 episodes of the series.  As of 2012, the series has been released on DVD by Mill Creek yet again, this time under the title of The Adventures of Sherlock Holmes. The Mill Creek DVD releases feature short introductions by Christopher Lee, taken from the 1985 documentary The Many Faces of Sherlock Holmes.

In 2014 Tropics Entertainment released all 39 episodes on ten disc DVD set.

Also in 2014 RLJ Entertainment released the entire series on 2 DVDs titled "Best of Sherlock Holmes."

In 2017 it was released as a single disc Blu-ray release in Germany with original English language.

Reception
When the series debuted, it was a hit. This Week declared "You won't want to miss this 4-star video event." Variety reviewed the series on October 20, 1954, and called the show "a winner that avoids the customary cliches that seem inevitable in any treatment of the Conan Doyle stories."

The series was voted Best New Mystery in the non-network film series division in Billboard's 3rd Annual TV Film Program and Talent Awards, based on an "all-industry vote".

References

External links

Internet Archive links:
Entire Series.

Sherlock Holmes page of Ronald Howard website
Mr. Howard's reflections on the program

1954 American television series debuts
1955 American television series endings
1950s American mystery television series
Black-and-white American television shows
First-run syndicated television programs in the United States
Sherlock Holmes television series
American detective television series
Television shows filmed in Paris